Ribeira Funda is a settlement in the Lembá District in the northwestern part of São Tomé Island in São Tomé and Príncipe. Its population is 282 (2012 census).

Population history

References

Populated places in Lembá District
Populated coastal places in São Tomé and Príncipe